Chorherrenkäse, also known as Prälatenkäse, is a semi-hard cheese made from cow's milk and sometimes buttermilk.  The cheese, which is matured in lactic acid, is made in the Tyrol state of Austria.

Chorherrenkäse or Chor Herren Käse translates from German as "chorister cheese."  As early as 1469, Chorherrenkäse was cited as a method of payment in the accounting books of the choristers of the Reichersberg Monastery.

Based on monastery or Trappist-style cheeses, Chorherrenkäse uses rennet to separate its curds and whey, was originally dipped in white wax and is now packaged in a loaf-shaped white plastic rind.  The cheese is described for having a mild, buttery taste with a hint of nuttiness and is noted for its light yellow color, numerous small eyes (air bubbles) and white rind.  It is recommended that Chorherrenkäse "rest" in its manufacture.

Chorherrenkäse is similar to other cheeses from Austria, e.g., Shardinger Amadeus, another mild, semi-firm light yellow cheese — manufactured in Austria — but in Styria rather than Tyrol.

See also
 List of cheeses

References

Austrian cheeses
Cow's-milk cheeses